Bull is a British television sitcom created and written by Gareth Gwynn and John-Luke Roberts, who adapted it for television from their radio pilot, Antiquity.

The show stars well-known comic actors Robert Lindsay and Maureen Lipman as the eponymous siblings and antiques shop owners Rupert and Beverley Bull, around whom the programme centres, alongside Claudia Jessie and Naz Osmanoglu as their hapless staff-members Faye and Toby respectively.

Cast 
 Robert Lindsay as Rupert Bull
 Maureen Lipman as Beverley
 Claudia Jessie as Faye
 Naz Osmanoglu  as Toby
 Matt Lucas as Mr Richards
 Toby Williams as Desmond

Production
Bull was one of three sitcoms, alongside Marley's Ghosts and Henry IX, announced by UKTV on 28 May 2015, and was initially slated for broadcast in late 2015 or early 2016.

The show was created by writers Gareth Gwynn and John-Luke Roberts, who adapted it from their 2010 Radio 4 pilot, Antiquity, which had starred Tim McInnerny as Rupert Bull.

Screenings at which a laughter track was recorded for the programme took place before a studio audience between 4 September, and 10 September 2015.

Broadcast and reception

Critical reception
Bull received highly positive reviews from critics, with particular praise reserved for Robert Lindsay's performance.

Reviewing for the Independent, Sally Newall wrote the series "left [her] wanting more", singling out for particular praise Matt Lucas' "scene-stealing" guest turn, and the performances of leads Lindsay and Lipman, who were a "treat to watch". She also praised the plotting as "unpredictable and illogical", to her a sign of "good surreal comedy". Writing for Beyond the Joke, Bruce Dessau acclaimed the series as "endearingly, instantly classic", again singling out Lindsay for particular praise as "his pedigree is second to none". He also praised an "elaborate knockabout visual gag", which opened the first episode, as "So brilliant, in fact that they shamelessly do it twice".

References

External links 
 

British television sitcoms
2015 British television series debuts
2015 British television series endings
Antiques television series
Gold (British TV channel) original programming
Television series set in shops
2010s British sitcoms
2010s British workplace comedy television series
Television series produced at Pinewood Studios
English-language television shows